Arisleyda Dilone is a director and actress. She is best known for her work on the documentary films Mami y Yo y mi Gallito and Two White Cars.

Life and career
Arisleyda was born in Santiago de los Caballeros, Dominican Republic and now lives in New York City. Her directorial debut documentary film Mami y Yo y mi Gallito screened at Harvard University. In 2015, she was awarded Astraea Intersex Fund for her documentary work. In 2018, she won fellowship from MacDowell Colony. She is intersex and has intersex variation XY gonadal dysgenesis.

Filmography

References

External links

Living people
American film actresses
American people of Dominican Republic descent
Intersex women
Year of birth missing (living people)
Intersex writers
21st-century American women
Intersex actors